The Deep Purple is a 1920 American silent crime drama film directed by Raoul Walsh from a 1910 play co-written by Wilson Mizner and  Paul Armstrong. The picture stars Miriam Cooper and Helen Ware and is a remake of the 1915 lost film The Deep Purple. It is not known whether the 1920 film currently survives.

Plot
As described in a film magazine, country village maiden Doris Moore (Cooper) listens intently to the wooing of Harry Leland (Serrano), a crook who is in the neighborhood with Pop Clark (Ferguson), another professional crook. Believing in his promise of marriage, Doris goes with Harry and Pop when they return to the city. Kate Fallon (Ware), a boarding house keeper, protects Doris from Harry, but she becomes involved in a plot to rob William Lake (Sage), a wealthy westerner. Doris swings around to the right side when she meets William and love springs into being. The crooks are defeated in their designs and William and Doris are then brought into happiness.

Cast
Miriam Cooper as Doris Moore
Helen Ware as Kate Fallon
Vincent Serrano as Harry Leland
William J. Ferguson as Pop Clark
Stuart Sage as William Lake
William B. Mack as Gordon Laylock
Lincoln Plumer as Connelly
Ethel Hallor as Flossie
Lorraine Frost as Phyllis Lake
Louis Mackintosh as Mrs. Lake
Amy Ongley as Christine
Walter Lawrence as Finn
J.C. King as Inspector George Bruce
Eddie Sturgis as Skinny
C.A. de Lima as Balke
Bird Millman as High-Wire Performer

References

External links

 
 lantern slide

1920 films
American silent feature films
Remakes of American films
American films based on plays
Films directed by Raoul Walsh
1920 crime drama films
American crime drama films
American black-and-white films
1920s American films
Silent American drama films